Jay Parkash Yadav (born January 1, 1964) is Vice-Chancellor, Indira Gandhi University, Rewari since April 3, 2022 to April, 2025. He is an Indian biologist and professor of genetics best known for his research on genetics. He was awarded Prof. R.P. Roy Young Scientist by Society of Cytology and Genetics, India.

Early life
He was born in Khatiwas village of Jhajjar District in Haryana State.

Education
In 1986 he completed his M. Sc. Biosciences and in 1991 Ph. D. Biosciences was awarded.

career
He is head in Department of Genetics in Maharshi Dayanand University, Rohtak.  In 2008 he was awarded UGC fellowship under education Cultural Exchange Programme to visit South Africa. International Travel Grant from CSIR, New Delhi & CCSTDS, Chennai to attend SEGH 2010 at Ireland was awarded in 2010.

Research
He as an erudite researcher and more than 200 research papers of international repute are to his credit. He has guided many Ph.D.'s.

Books
 Environmental Education, G.V.S. Publisher, 3746, Ist Floor, Kucha Parmanand, Darya Ganj New Delhi (2002). Pages 1–545. .
 Medicinal Plants and Genetic Diversity. LAP LAMBERT Academic Publishing GmbH & Co., Germany (2012). Pages 296. .
 Activity of Medicinal Plants Against Isolates of Oral Cancer Cases. LAP LAMBERT Academic Publishing GmbH & Co., Germany (2012). Pages 240. .
 Genetic diversity and hypoglycemic studies of Salvadora species. LAP LAMBERT Academic Publishing GmbH & Co., Germany (2013). Pages 224. .

References 

Indian biologists
Indian geneticists
Living people
Life extensionists
Biogerontologists
1964 births
Maharshi Dayanand University